Tutyu and Totyo (Hungarian: Tutyu és Totyó) is a 1915 Hungarian silent film directed by Alexander Korda and starring Gusztáv Vándory.

References

External links

1915 films
Hungarian silent films
Films directed by Alexander Korda
Hungarian black-and-white films
Austro-Hungarian films